Coutinho is a noble Portuguese language surname. It is a diminutive of Couto (Couto means 'enclosed pasture'). It is from Late Latin cautum, from the past participle of cavere ‘to make safe.'
It may refer to:

Artists
Afrânio Coutinho (1911–2000), Brazilian literary critic and essayist
Domício Coutinho, Brazilian novelist
Eduardo Coutinho (1933–2014), Brazilian film director
Kemiyondo Coutinho, Ugandan actress and filmmaker
Laerte Coutinho (born 1951), Brazilian cartoonist and screenwriter
Rafael Coutinho (born 1980), Brazilian comics creator
Sonia Coutinho (1939–2013), Brazilian journalist

Politicians
Aires Pinto de Sousa Coutinho, former captain-general of the Azores
Alberto Coutinho (born 1969), American politician
António Alva Rosa Coutinho (1926–2010), Portuguese admiral and political activist
António de Sousa Coutinho, Portuguese politician and former governor of Portuguese Ceylon
António Borges Coutinho (1923–2011), Portuguese lawyer and politician
Augusto Coutinho (born 1962), Brazilian politician
Aureliano Coutinho, Viscount of Sepetiba (1800–1855), Brazilian politician
Claire Coutinho (born 1985), British Member of Parliament elected 2019
Diogo de Melo Coutinho, captain-general of Portuguese Ceylon
Domingos António de Sousa Coutinho, 1st Marquis of Funchal (1762–1833), Portuguese diplomat
Fernão Martins da Fonseca Coutinho, Portuguese nobleman
Francisco Coutinho, 4th Count of Marialva (1465–1532), Portuguese nobleman
Gonçalo Coutinho, 2nd Count of Marialva, Portuguese nobleman
Gonçalo Vasques Coutinho, 2nd Marshal of Portugal, Portuguese nobleman
Henrique da Silva Coutinho, fourth president of the Brazilian state of Espírito Santo
Humberto Coutinho (1946–2018), Brazilian physician and politician
José Pereira Coutinho (born 1957), Macanese politician
Luís Pinto de Sousa Coutinho, 1st Viscount of Balsemão (1735–1804), Portuguese nobleman
Mariana Carlota de Verna Magalhães Coutinho, Countess of Belmonte (1779–1855), Portuguese-born Brazilian court official
Manuel de Sousa Coutinho (1540–1591), Portuguese colonial official
Ricardo Coutinho (born 1960), Brazilian politician
Rodrigo de Sousa Coutinho, 1st Count of Linhares (1755–1812), Portuguese nobleman
Vasco Fernandes Coutinho, Portuguese nobleman
D. Vasco Fernandes Coutinho (c. 1385–1450), 3rd Marshal of Portugal, 1st Count of Marialva
Vasco Fernandes Coutinho (1490–1561), founder of the Brazilian state of Espirito Santo
Victor Hugo de Azevedo Coutinho (1871–1955), Portuguese naval officer, politician and professor
D. Vitório Maria Francisco de Sousa Coutinho Teixeira de Andrade Barbosa (1790–1857), 2nd Count of Linhares, former Portuguese prime minister

Sportspeople
Coutinho (footballer, born 1943) (1943–2019; Antônio Wilson Vieira Honório), Brazilian football manager and former striker
Coutinho (footballer, born 1984) (1984–2020; Rafael Coutinho Barcellos dos Santos), Brazilian footballer
Alice Coutinho (born 2000), French cyclist
Andrey Coutinho (born 1990), Brazilian footballer
Anthony Coutinho (born 1940), Indian sprinter
Bruno Coutinho (footballer, born 1969), Indian footballer
Bruno Coutinho (footballer, born 1986), Brazilian footballer
Cláudio Coutinho (1939–1981), Brazilian football manager
Diogo Coutinho (born 1977), Portuguese rugby player
Domingos António de Sousa Coutinho, Marquês do Funchal (1896–1984), Portuguese horse rider
Douglas Coutinho (born 1994), Brazilian footballer
Geisa Coutinho (born 1980), Brazilian track and field athlete
Gino Coutinho (born 1982), Dutch footballer
Gustavo Coutinho (born 1999), Brazilian footballer
Hudson Coutinho (born 1972), Brazilian football manager
John Coutinho (born 1989), Indian footballer
Lucas Coutinho (born 1996), Brazilian footballer
Mirella Coutinho (born 1994), Brazilian water polo player
Philippe Coutinho (born 1992), Brazilian footballer
Piedade Coutinho (1920–1997), Brazilian Olympic women's swimmer
Rogério de Assis Silva Coutinho (born 1987), Brazilian footballer

Scientists and doctors
António Coutinho (born 1946), Portuguese immunologist
D. António Xavier Pereira Coutinho (1851–1939), Portuguese botanist
Elsimar M. Coutinho (1930–2020), Brazilian gynecologist

Others
Alex Coutinho (born 1959), Ugandan physician
Álvaro Coutinho Aguirre (1899–1987), Brazilian agriculturalist and zoologist
Carlos Viegas Gago Coutinho (1869–1959), Portuguese aviator
Diogo de Melo Coutinho (15th century), Portuguese navigator
Duarte Borges Coutinho (1921–1981), former president of S.L. Benfica
D. José Bezerra Coutinho (1910–2008), Brazilian bishop
José Joaquim da Cunha Azeredo Coutinho (1742–1821), Portuguese bishop
Luciano Coutinho (born 1948), Brazilian economist
Maria Júlia Coutinho (born 1978), Brazilian journalist, television presenter, and commentator
Mariana Joaquina Pereira Coutinho (1748–1820), Portuguese courtier and salonist

See also

Surnames
Portuguese-language surnames
Surnames of Portuguese origin